Silver Creek Township is a township in 
Ida County, Iowa, USA. The 2020 US census reported the township having a population of 49 with the median age being 73.2.

References

Ida County, Iowa
Townships in Iowa